The women's tournament in wheelchair basketball at the 2016 Summer Paralympics was held between 8–16 September.

Calendar

Rosters

Group stage

Group A

Group B

Knockout stage

Classification playoffs

9th/10th place playoff

7th/8th place playoff

5th/6th place playoff

Quarter-finals

Semi-finals

Bronze medal match

Gold medal match

Ranking

See also
 Wheelchair basketball at the 2016 Summer Paralympics – Men

References

Women
International women's basketball competitions hosted by Brazil